Jack Doohan may refer to:
 Jack Doohan (politician)
 Jack Doohan (racing driver)